3700 Geowilliams, provisional designation , is a stony background asteroid from the inner regions of the asteroid belt, approximately  in diameter. It was discovered on 23 October 1984, by American astronomer couple Carolyn and Eugene Shoemaker at the Palomar Observatory in California, United States. The S k-subtype has a rotation period of 14.38 hours. It was named for Australian geologist George E. Williams.

Orbit and classification 

Geowilliams is a non-family asteroid from the main belt's background population. It orbits the Sun in the inner main-belt at a distance of 1.9–3.0 AU once every 3 years and 9 months (1,371 days; semi-major axis of 2.41 AU). Its orbit has an eccentricity of 0.23 and an inclination of 12° with respect to the ecliptic.

Physical characteristics 

In the SMASS classification, Geowilliams is a Sk-subtype that transitions between the common S-type asteroid and the K-type asteroid. The latter spectral type is often found among members of the Eos family.

Rotation period 

In January 2008, a rotational lightcurve of Geowilliams was obtained from photometric observations by Australian amateur astronomer David Higgins at the Hunters Hill Observatory . Lightcurve analysis gave a well-defined rotation period of 14.387 hours with a brightness variation of 0.40 magnitude. In July 2010, a similar period of 14.383 hours and an amplitude of 0.42 was measured at the Palomar Transient Factory in California.

Diameter and albedo 

According to the surveys carried out by the Japanese Akari satellite and the NEOWISE mission of NASA's Wide-field Infrared Survey Explorer, Geowilliams measures between 7.712 and 8.82 kilometers in diameter and its surface has an albedo between 0.227 and 0.297.

The Collaborative Asteroid Lightcurve Link assumes a standard albedo for a stony asteroid of 0.20, and calculates a diameter of 8.97 kilometers based on an absolute magnitude of 12.6.

Naming 

This minor planet was named after Australian geologist George E. Williams who discovered the Acraman crater when he worked for BHP in South Australia. The old 90-kilometer impact structure is one of the largest meteorite impact craters known on Earth and the largest one on the Australian continent. The official naming citation was published by the Minor Planet Center on 2 February 1988.

Notes

References

External links 
 
 George E. Williams – University Staff Director, University of Adelaide
 Asteroid Lightcurve Database (LCDB), query form (info )
 Dictionary of Minor Planet Names, Google books
 Discovery Circumstances: Numbered Minor Planets (1)-(5000) – Minor Planet Center
 
 

003700
Discoveries by Carolyn S. Shoemaker
Discoveries by Eugene Merle Shoemaker
Named minor planets
003700
19841023